George Chandler (1898–1985) was an American actor.

George Chandler may also refer to:

 George Clarke Chandler (1906–1964), Canadian broadcaster
 George Chandler (priest) (1779–1859), Dean of Chichester Cathedral, 1830–1859
 George Chandler (librarian), National Library of Australia director
 George Chandler, American vocalist with Olympic Runners and Londonbeat
 George Fletcher Chandler (1872–1964), first Superintendent of the New York State Police